The Society of Korean Poets (Hangul : 한국시인협회, Hanja : 韓國詩人協會) is a literary organization established by poets in 1957. It is the oldest poetry organization in South Korea.

Every year, the organization awards the Society of Korean Poets Award, and holds the National High School Students' Literary Prize.

Today it has 1,500 members. The current president is Choi Dong-ho.(The current office is located at Unni-dong 65-1, Jongno-gu, Seoul)

The past presidents are Yu Chi-hwan, Cho Chi-hun, Chang Man-yong, Shin Seok Cho, Park Mok-wol, Jung Han Mo, Cho Byung-hwa, Kim Nam-jo, Kim Chunsu, Kim Jong-gil, Hong Yun-suk, Kim Kwang-lim, Lee Hyeonggi, Sung Chan-gyeong, Chyung Jinkyu, Huh Young-ja, Lee Geunbae, Kim Jong-hae, Oh Sae-Young, Oh Takbeon and Kim Jong-chul.

Event activities
 Society of Korean Poets Award

 National High School Student Essay Contest

 Si-nangsong (poetry recitation) event
 JEI Poetry Recitation Contest (joint hosting: JEI Corporation)

See also
 Honorary Poets
 Si-nangsong

References

External links
  

Poetry organizations
Korean poetry
1957 establishments in South Korea
South Korean writers' organizations